Julián Gómez (born September 19, 1978, in Cali) is a Colombian-born American retired professional soccer player.

Early life 
Gómez grew up playing soccer in the Long Island Junior Soccer League.

Playing career 
Gómez was waived by MetroStars on January 22, 2001.

Statistics

References

External links 
 Profile on MetroFanatic
 

1975 births
Living people
Footballers from Cali
American soccer players
Association football forwards
Brooklyn Knights players
New York Red Bulls players
Major League Soccer players
Nassau Community College alumni